Jacek Dembiński (born 20 December 1969) is a retired Polish footballer who played as a forward.

Honours
 Ekstraklasa: 1991–92, 1992–93, 1996–97

References

External links
 
 

1969 births
Living people
Polish footballers
Poland international footballers
Lech Poznań players
FC Lausanne-Sport players
Widzew Łódź players
Amica Wronki players
Hamburger SV players
Bundesliga players
Ekstraklasa players
Polish expatriate footballers
Expatriate footballers in Germany
Expatriate footballers in Switzerland
Footballers from Poznań
Association football forwards